Ain Beida (lit. white eye) is a town and commune in Sidi Khouïled District, Ouargla Province, Algeria. According to the 2008 census it has a population of 19,039, up from 14,500 in 1998, and an annual population growth rate of 2.8%. Ain Beida is just  from central Ouargla and is effectively a suburb of the city. It is also home to the Ain Beida Airport, Ouargla's principal airport.

Climate

Ain Beida has a hot desert climate (Köppen climate classification BWh), with very hot summers and mild winters. Rainfall is light and sporadic, and summers are particularly dry.

Education

5.4% of the population has a tertiary education, and another 16.2% has completed secondary education. The overall literacy rate is 82.5%, and is 91.1% among males and 73.5% among females.

Localities
The commune is composed of four localities:
Aïn Beida
Chott
Adjadja
Aïn Guedima

References

Neighbouring towns and cities

Communes of Ouargla Province